Jacques Cousseau (10 May 1925 in Morocco - 24 September 2017 in Paris), was a French writer, screenwriter and actor

Bibliography 
1956: Temps chaud, Coréa
1957: Le chien gris, Buchet/Chastel
1958: Le Vieux Pocco, Buchet/Chastel 
1960: Les Singes, Buchet/Chastel
1962: La Morte, éditions Julliard
1966: L'Éblouissement, éditions Gallimard

Filmography 
Screenwriter
 1967: If I Were a Spy by Bertrand Blier

Theatre 

External links 
 
 Picture of the writer, right to Dorothée Blanck
 Jacques Cousseau on Babelio

References 

20th-century French male actors
French male screenwriters
French screenwriters
20th-century French non-fiction writers
Prix Fénéon winners
1925 births
2017 deaths
French expatriates in Morocco